Adrian Bouchet is an English actor and presenter, most widely known for playing the roles of Steapa in the BBC and Netflix TV series, The Last Kingdom.

Early Life 
Bouchet was born in Rhodesia and left during the Rhodesian Bush War to settle in UK. He is a graduate of Birmingham University. He attended Birmingham School of Acting. He began acting in television productions in the late 1990s. In 1998 he appeared in an episode of the television series Police Doctor Dangerfield. In the next few years he was able to establish himself as an actor as an episode actor in series and as a supporting actor in film productions.

Career 

Bouchet was cast as Marc Antony in the Cleopatra episode of The Mystery Files and also as Riothamus in the King Arthur episode of the same Season 1 series. In 2011, he received the Best Actor International award at the 2011 International Film Festival for his performance in the film A Brunette Kiss opposite Bridie Latona. In 2012 he had the role of Brett in the action film Interview with a Hitman. In 2014 he played an unnamed knight in the film Morning Star who wants to give the bones of his friend who died in battle to his family. In 2014 he was Robert the Bruce in the feature film Battle of Kings: Bannockburn. In the same year he played a US Army sergeant opposite Matt Damon and George Clooney in The Monuments Men directed by Clooney. In 2015 he portrayed the role of Lucan in the film Arthur and Merlin. Two years later, he was cast in King Arthur: Legend of the Sword again in a film that was Arthurian Legend themed. 2016 he portrayed the role of Judah Ben Hur in The Asylum-movie In the Name of Ben Hur. From 2017 to 2020 Bouchet played Steapa, King Alfred’s Captain of the Guard, in 21 episodes of The Last Kingdom. 2019 he portrayed the role of Billy Ford in the monstermovie Monster Island. 2021 he also played the Holy Roman Emperor Frederick 1, known as Frederick Barbarossa, in seven episodes of the Medieval Spanish TV series, Glow and Darkness with Jayne Seymour and Joan Collins.

Filmography

Film

Television

Stage 
 A Midsummer Night's Dream (Folksy Theatre)
 On the Piste	(Oldham Coliseum Theatre)
 Troilus & Cressida (Theatr Clwyd)
 Don't Dress For Dinner (The English Theatre of Hamburg)
 On the Piste (Hull Truck)
 The Bridge (Mouthpiece Theatre)
 Romeo & Juliet (Fleighton Productions)
 Alfred & the Burned Buns (Theatre West)
 Macbeth (C'est Tous Theatre)
 Twelfth Night	(Now and Then Productions)
 Pink For A Boy (Space Theatre)
 Cinder Eddie & the Sleeping (Space Theatre)
 The Vital Spark (Wet Arts Theatre)
 Death & the Maiden (C'est Tous Theatre)
 Romeo & Juliet (C'est Tous Theatre)
 As You like It (Cambridge Shakespeare Festival)
 Twelfth Night	(Cambridge Shakespeare Festival)

External links 
 
 Adrian Bouchet in der Deutschen Synchronkartei
 
 Homepage of Adrian Bouchet

References 

20th-century births
21st-century English male actors
English male film actors
English male television actors
Living people

Year of birth missing (living people)